The 2017 Launceston Tennis International is a professional tennis tournament played on outdoor hard courts. It is the third edition (for men) and sixth edition (for women) of the tournament which was part of the 2017 ATP Challenger Tour and the 2017 ITF Women's Circuit, offering a total of $75,000 in prize money for men and $60,000 for women. It will take place in Launceston, Tasmania, Australia, on 4-12 February 2017.

Men's singles entrants

Seeds 

 1 Rankings as of January 30, 2017.

Other entrants 
The following players received wildcards into the singles main draw:
  Maverick Banes
  Alex Bolt
  Harry Bourchier
  Daniel Nolan

The following players received entry from the qualifying draw:
  Sebastian Fanselow
  James Frawley
  Bradley Mousley
  Yang Tsung-hua

The following players received entry as lucky losers:
  Luca Margaroli
  Nathan Pasha

Women's singles entrants

Seeds

Other entrants 
The following players received wildcards into the singles main draw:
  Kimberly Birrell
  Jaimee Fourlis
  Maddison Inglis
  Sally Peers

The following players received entry from the qualifying draw:
  Tessah Andrianjafitrimo
  Georgia Brescia
  Tian Ran
  Xu Yifan

Champions

Men's singles 

  Noah Rubin def.  Mitchell Krueger 6–0, 6–1.

Women's singles 

  Jamie Loeb def.  Tamara Zidanšek, 7–6(7–4), 6–3

Men's doubles 

  Bradley Mousley /  Luke Saville def.  Alex Bolt /  Andrew Whittington 6–2, 6–1.

Women's doubles 

  Monique Adamczak /  Nicole Melichar def.  Georgia Brescia /  Tamara Zidanšek, 6–1, 6–2

External links 
 2017 Launceston Tennis International at tennis.com.au

2017 ITF Women's Circuit
2017 ATP Challenger Tour
2017 in Australian tennis
2017
February 2017 sports events in Australia